Opening of the Auckland Industrial and Mining Exhibition was an 1898 New Zealand documentary film.

The earliest New Zealand films being from the first of December 1898, the opening of the Auckland Industrial and Mining Exhibition, and Boxing Day that year, Uhlan winning the Auckland Cup at Ellerslie Racecourse.

Synopsis
The film of the Auckland Industrial and Mining Exhibition opening included scenes of the Newton Band playing, the governor arriving with a cavalry escort, and people entering the building.

References

1890s New Zealand films
1898 films
1898 in New Zealand
1890s short documentary films
Black-and-white documentary films
Films set in New Zealand
Lost New Zealand films
New Zealand short documentary films
New Zealand silent short films